Arthur Wiechula (January 20, 1867 – 1941) was a German landscape engineer. His marriage to Lydia Lindnau, produced three children, Margarethe (1895), Max (1897) and Ernst (1900).

He received the German Royal State Inventor's Honor Cross.   In 1926, he published Wachsende Häuser aus lebenden Bäumen entstehend  (Developing Houses from Living Trees) in German, describing simple building techniques involves guiding and grafting live branches together; including a system of v-shaped lateral cuts used to bend and curve individual trunks and branches in the direction of a design, with reaction wood soon closing the wounds to hold the curve.

He envisioned growing trees so that it constituted walls during growth, thereby enabling the use of young trees for building.  He never built a living home, but he grew a  wall of Canadian poplars to help keep the snow off a section of train tracks.  His illustrated ideas have inspired many other artists to attempt to grow a house of trees.

See also

References

External links
World Tree shapers, history and links
Arthur Wiechula

1867 births
1941 deaths
German landscape architects
German engineers